Samantha Farquharson (born 15 December 1969) is an English athlete.

Farquharson competed at the 1994 Commonwealth Games where she won a bronze medal in the Women's 100 metres hurdles event and at the 1995 IAAF World Indoor Championships in the Women's 60 metres hurdles event where she finished 15th.

References

1969 births
Living people
English athletes
Athletes (track and field) at the 1994 Commonwealth Games
Commonwealth Games competitors for England
Commonwealth Games medallists in athletics
Commonwealth Games bronze medallists for England
Medallists at the 1994 Commonwealth Games